Thozama Gangi, is a South African businesswoman and corporate executive, who serves as the chief executive officer of Eskom Uganda Limited, a Ugandan subsidiary of the South African energy utility company Eskom. She assumed her current position in 2015, replacing Nokwanda Mngeni.

Background and education
Thozama was born in South Africa, and she attended local elementary and secondary schools. Her first degree is a Bachelor of Science in Mathematics and Education, awarded by the University of Transkei (now Walter Sisulu University).
Her second degree is a Master of Science in Engineering Business Management, obtained from the University of Warwick in the United Kingdom. She also holds a Master of Leadership and Strategy, awarded by Sorbonne University in France.

Career
At the time she was appointed CEO at Eskom Uganda, Thazoma had been with Eskom for 14 years, having joined circa 2001. She started out at the Matimba Power Station as a "Boiler Engineering Manager". She served in various positions in the company, with concentration in the company's "generation business".

Other considerations
Thozama Gangi was appointed as the founding chairperson of the Energy Generators and Distributors Association of Uganda (EGADAU). The industry association, with 13 founding member organizations, was officially launched on 2 December 2020. The members of EGADAU are listed in the table below:

Personal details
Thozama Gangi is a mother to one sons.

See also
 Energy in Uganda
 Energy in South Africa

References

External links
  Website of Eskom Uganda Limited
 Energy minister, company apologise for blackout As of 16 April 2020.
 Eskom changes Uganda top leadership As of 10 May 2012.

Year of birth missing (living people)
Living people
21st-century South African businesswomen
21st-century South African businesspeople
Walter Sisulu University alumni
Alumni of the University of Warwick
South African chief executives
University of Paris alumni
South African expatriates in the United Kingdom
South African expatriates in France
South African expatriates in Uganda